The Czech Handball Association (CHA) is the administrative and controlling body for handball and beach handball in Czech Republic. Founded in 1968, CHA is a member of European Handball Federation (EHF) and the International Handball Federation (IHF).

National teams
 Czech Republic men's national handball team
 Czech Republic men's national junior handball team
 Czech Republic women's national handball team

Competitions
 Czech Handball Extraliga
 Czech Women's Handball First Division

References

External links
 Official website  
 Czech Republic at the IHF website.
 Czech Republic at the EHF website.

Handball in the Czech Republic
Handball
Sports organizations established in 1968
1968 establishments in Czechoslovakia
Handball governing bodies
European Handball Federation
National members of the International Handball Federation
Organizations based in Prague